Mprim is a village in the Mampong Municipal, a municipality in the Ashanti Region of Ghana.

Renowned native citizens

References

Populated places in the Ashanti Region
Villages in Ghana